Suhasini Das, (1915 - 30 May 2009) was an anti-British activist, social worker and politician from Bangladesh. She was a member of the Indian National Congress and an important figure in East Bengal, before, during and after Partition.

Biography 
Das was born in 1915 in Jagannathpur village in Sunamganj district, East Bengal. Her parents were Parimohan and Shobha Roy; she had two younger brothers and two younger sisters. When she was six years old a school was built in her village - until then children had to travel 22 miles to Sylhet to be educated. She was married aged 18 to a businessman, Kumud Chandra Das, who owned the Kuti-Chand Press. Marriage had halted Das' education, however over the following years her friend Sarju, who was a private tutor, taught her how to read and write Bengali and English. In 1938, she and her husband visited Kolkata and witnessed the funeral procession of Jatindra Mohan Sengutpta. In 1939, her daughter Nilema was born, but shortly afterwards, her husband died of a fever.

Career 
The death of her husband enabled greater independence for Das - after a period of mourning, she decided to turn her house into a centre for thread-making and charkha, which enabled Bengali and Manipuri women and girls to earn money, but more importantly the work and the environment provided education. In order to fund this she used the wealth inherited after the death of her husband. The charkha became a symbol of Indian independence and on 20 January 1940, Das announced that she would only wear khaddar clothes for the rest of her life.

Das was a supporter of Gandhi. In 1942 she joined the Quit India Movement, which was under Gandhi's leadership; Das was imprisoned alongside other members. In 1943, Suhasini Das was released from jail. She was also a supporter of the Non-Cooperation Movement. She later joined the Indian National Congress. 
During Partition in 1947, Das travelled widely in the Sylhet area, encouraging Hindu people to stay at home and tried to calm their fears. From 1946 to 1947, Das worked in a relief camp in Noakhali, one of seventeen set up by Leela Roy, following the riots which took place there. Whilst working there she contracted smallpox, and was visited by Gandhi whilst recovering.

After Partition ended, Das remained in Sylhet and, along with Prunendu Sen and Nikunja Goswami, founded schools and set up a variety of strategies to enable communities to be financially stable. In 1947, Das was instrumental in establishing the Rangirkul Ashram, which she ultimately became leader of.

During the war for independence in 1971, it was Das' leadership which protected the ashram. After independence, Das left politics to concentrate on her social and religious work. However, in 1973, she still attended a conference of anti-British freedom fighters in Delhi, where she highlighted to role of people from East Bengal in the struggle.

In 1986, Das attended the World Hindu Congress in Nepal. Religious tolerance and understanding was very important to her and in 1990 worked to restore faith between Hindus and Muslims after attacks on mosques and temples.

Awards 
In 1997, Bangladesh gave Das its highest award for 'Social Service'.

Death 
Das died on 30 May 2009 in Sylhet. She had fallen whilst taking a bath on 25 May and was admitted to hospital. At the news of her death, crowds gathered in a vigil outside the hospital.

Legacy 
Das published her memoirs under the title Sekaler Sylhet (Sylhet during the British Raj: Memories of Suhasini Das) in 2005. These are a vital resource for understanding Partition in East Bengal, particularly from a female perspective. These diaries recorded the rising dominance of the Muslim League and the pressures the Hindu minority felt. One of the halls at Sylhet Agricultural University is named after her.

References 

1915 births
2009 deaths
Bangladeshi women's rights activists
Bangladeshi activists
Bangladeshi Hindus
Indian social workers